The following is a list of international prime ministerial trips made by Narendra Modi since he became the Prime Minister of India following the 2014 Indian general election. He did not make any international trips in 2020 due to COVID-19 pandemic.

Summary of international trips

:

2014

2015

2016

2017

2018

2019

2021

2022

Multilateral meetings

See also
 List of international trips made by prime ministers of India
 History of Indian foreign relations
 Premiership of Narendra Modi

References

External links
 Outgoing Visits – by Ministry of External Affairs

Prime Ministerial trips
Indian prime ministerial visits
Prime Ministerial trips
Modi
2014 in international relations
2015 in international relations
2016 in international relations
2015 in foreign relations of India
Narendra Modi-related lists